The Doris Day Show is an American sitcom which was originally broadcast on CBS from September 1968 until March 1973, remaining on the air for five seasons and 128 episodes.

The series is remembered for its multiple format and cast changes over the course of its  five-year run. The show is also notable for Day's statement, in her autobiography Doris Day: Her Own Story (1975), that her husband Martin Melcher had signed her to do the series without her knowledge, a fact she only discovered when Melcher died of heart disease on April 20, 1968. (He also received credit on the series as "executive producer" during its initial season.)

Series run

Season 1 (1968–1969)
Day portrays Doris Martin, a widowed mother of young sons Billy and Toby (Philip Brown and Todd Starke). When the series premieres, she has brought her boys home to her father's rural ranch in Mill Valley, north of San Francisco, California, after living in New York City for most of her adult life.

Other characters during this initial phase of the program include Doris's father Buck Webb (Denver Pyle) and their naïve hired ranch hand, LeRoy B. Simpson (James Hampton). Their housekeeper initially is Aggie Thompson (Fran Ryan, who left after the first 10 episodes to replace Barbara Pepper as Doris Ziffel in Green Acres). The character left without explanation and was replaced by Juanita (Naomi Stevens). Lord Nelson is also included in the opening credits cast as Lord Nelson, the family's sheepdog.

Season 2 (1969–1970)
Doris begins to commute from the ranch to San Francisco, where she starts working as an executive secretary at Today's World magazine. New workplace characters are added: McLean Stevenson (who would later leave the series to star in M*A*S*H) plays her boss, Today's World editor Michael Nicholson, who is often referred to as 'Nick' by the other magazine executives; Rose Marie plays Doris' friend Myrna Gibbons, a fellow secretary at the magazine; Paul Smith portrays Ron Harvey, the magazine's assistant-editor and Myrna's boss. Pyle, Brown, and Starke remain regular cast members, while Hampton appears in only one episode, his character now married and owning a gas station in Mill Valley. Lord Nelson still appears uncredited as the family sheepdog in most episodes this season. There is no longer any housekeeper at the ranch, and no ranch hand was hired to replace Leroy.

Season 3 (1970–1971)
Doris tires of the commute between her work and the ranch and relocates herself, the boys, and the dog to San Francisco, where they rent an apartment above an Italian restaurant owned and operated by married couple Louie and Angie Pallucci (Bernie Kopell and Kaye Ballard). At first Louie is angry with Angie for renting the apartment to a widow with children and a large pet, but he eventually cherishes their new tenants after Billy and Toby praise his pizza. Angie also becomes one of Doris's best friends. Doris begins writing articles for the magazine under the auspices of Mr. Harvey, the assistant editor, but is still mainly a secretary. All of the regular characters from the previous season remain, with the exception of Pyle's Buck, who appears in only two episodes; no episodes from Season 3 onward take place on his ranch. (Pyle, however, remains on the show's staff behind the scenes, serving as a frequent episode director.) Hampton's character LeRoy appears in only one episode; he now lives in Montana and travels the rodeo circuit to raise the money to buy his own ranch. In this season Doris' nemesis, Willard Jarvis (Billy De Wolfe), moves in next door, causing trouble for her and her family in a few episodes. Lord Nelson again is not included in the opening credits cast list, but appears uncredited in a handful of episodes this season.

Seasons 4–5 (1971–1973)
The fourth season sees a radical change in the series. Day's character suddenly becomes a swinging single career woman who goes by Miss instead of Mrs. The entire cast from previous seasons, other than Day herself, and occasionally the Palluccis, are gone; even Doris Martin's two sons are no longer in the cast, with no explanation given, and are never referred to again. Doris Martin, still working for Today's World, now has a new editor, Cy Bennett, played by John Dehner, and she is now a full-time staff writer, and later an associate editor. Jackie Joseph joins the cast as Doris' friend and Cy's secretary at the magazine, Jackie Parker. Doris lives in the same apartment and the Palluccis, Angie in particular, are still on hand in the fourth season. In season 5, there is no mention of the Palluccis owning the building; the estate of the owner, an elderly man named Mr. Carter, sells the building after Carter's death to Doris's sometimes-nemesis, Mr. Jarvis, which initially alarms Doris, but she and the other tenants eventually accept him. In Season 4, Doris begins a romance with Dr. Peter Lawrence (Peter Lawford), which lasts until late into Season 5. That relationship is followed by one with old boyfriend Jonathan Rusk (Patrick O'Neal). The series continued with this format until Doris Day left the show choosing not to renew her five year contract in 1973. Day placed a one-paragraph statement in Variety saying more or less " Television is not the be all end all".

Change in premise
The Doris Day Show was a family-based sitcom for its first three seasons. The drastic premise change for season four in 1971 may be attributed to the overall change in CBS's programming philosophy, with the network canceling many rural-based and family programs, and replacing them with more urban, adult-oriented programs.

Cast

Main cast
 Doris Day as Doris Martin
 Philip Brown as Billy Martin (Seasons 1–3)
 Todd Starke as Toby Martin (Seasons 1–3)
 Denver Pyle as Buck Webb (Seasons 1–2, recurring Season 3)
 Lord Nelson as Lord Nelson (Seasons 1–2, recurring Season 3)
 James Hampton as LeRoy B. Simpson (Season 1, recurring Seasons 2–3)
 Fran Ryan as Aggie Thompson (first ten episodes of Season 1)
 Naomi Stevens as Juanita (last eighteen episodes of Season 1)
 McLean Stevenson as Michael 'Nick' Nicholson (Seasons 2–3)
 Rose Marie as Myrna Gibbons (Seasons 2–3)
 Paul Smith as Ron Harvey (Seasons 2–3)
 Bernie Kopell as Louie Pallucci (Season 3, recurring Season 4)
 Kaye Ballard as Angie Pallucci (Season 3, recurring Season 4)
 Billy DeWolfe as Willard Jarvis (recurring Seasons 2–5)
 John Dehner as Cyril Bennett (Seasons 4–5)
 Jackie Joseph as Jackie Parker (Seasons 4–5)
 Peter Lawford as Dr. Peter Lawrence (recurring Seasons 4–5)

Other notable cast
A number of other actors appeared in notable storylines covering several episodes sometimes over multiple seasons.
 Strother Martin as Tyrone Lovey (Season 1), an unscrupulous poacher and junk dealer
 Edward Andrews as Colonel Fairburn (Seasons 2–5), publisher of Today's World
 Larry Storch as Duke Farentino (Seasons 2–3), a boxer turned wannabe nightclub headliner
 Lew Ayres as William Tyler (Seasons 2–3), a reclusive billionaire businessman
 Johnny Haymer as Montagne (Seasons 2–3), a Parisian couturier
 Carol Worthington as Ethel Weber (Season 3), Doris's kooky friend who often acted as Billy and Toby's sitter (Worthington portrayed several other minor characters in the series prior to the Ethel Weber character)
 Van Johnson as Charlie Webb (Seasons 3–4), Doris's free-spirited cousin
 Jon Cypher as Sir Robert Kingsley (Seasons 4–5), a British knight and author, who was one of Doris's love interests
 Patrick O'Neal as Jonathan Rusk (Season 5), Doris's old boyfriend, aspiring politician, fellow journalist and another of her current love interests

Opening title and credits
The opening sequence features Day singing a rerecorded version of the Livingston & Evans song, "Que Sera, Sera (Whatever Will Be, Will Be)." The song had been introduced by Day in the 1956 Alfred Hitchcock suspense film The Man Who Knew Too Much, in which she co-starred with James Stewart. Despite the opening montage of images changing from season to season, Day singing the song off screen during the opening is the one constant over the entire course of the series, with a more family-oriented version (including a children's chorus) in Season 1 and a more adult contemporary version (with a stronger beat) in Seasons 4 and 5.

In the Season 1 opening title and credits, the cast members are seen in an outdoor, family styled environment. Beyond the cast credits, which show each cast member individually (including Lord Nelson, the sheepdog), the sequence features primarily Doris' family frolicking together in a sunny lakeside meadow.

In the Season 2 opening title and credits, Doris is seen wearing a bright yellow overcoat and matching rain hat leaving the ranch in her red convertible - Buck and the boys seeing her off - as she drives into San Francisco to go to work, which includes the show title displayed as she drives along a country highway, followed by her driving over the Golden Gate Bridge. It then moves into a sequence of her first driving down one of the hilly streets of the city, followed by general shots of the city (some including Doris), then the cast credits, where Buck and the boys are shown in an outdoor farm environment (Lord Nelson is no longer included), while the Today's World staff members are seen in the office. The opening sequence ends with Doris as a pedestrian on the city streets supposedly rushing off to work. This is interspersed with a sequence of Doris getting off a San Francisco cable car followed by her hopping across an intersection crosswalk (the cable car and hopping sequence is not part of this specific commute as she is wearing a red raincoat during it).

In the Season 3 opening title and credits, Doris is first seen running down the spiral staircase in her apartment, followed by a long shot of San Francisco itself over the show title. Much of the rest of the opening sequence is in the same style as Season 2, with the Today's World staff members now credited before Doris' sons, who are seen playing in an urban playground instead of on the ranch. Smith is now included in the opening credits, and despite being frequent cast members, Kopell, Ballard and De Wolfe are not.

In the Season 4 and Season 5 opening title and credits, the first half up to the cast credits is in much the same style as Season 3, except there are no longer children in the cast (only Day, Dehner and Joseph are credited in the opening) and the cable car and hopping montage moved to before the cast credits. The end of the opening, following the cast credits, features Doris in a fashion show, modeling clothes.  In the final episodes of Season 5, however, the credit montage changes.  Instead of Day wearing the yellow pantsuit shown in the Season 3 and Season 4 openers, she wears a black frilled gown as she descends the staircase.  This cuts to a shot of her from the Season 5 fashion show in which she wears a tan coat and holds a bouquet of purple flowers.

Nielsen ratings

Home media
MPI Home Video has released all five seasons of The Doris Day Show on DVD in Region 1. Each DVD release contains extensive special features.
In Region 2, Turbine Medien has released all eighteen available German episodes of the first and second season on DVD in Germany contains extensive special features.
In Region 4, Umbrella Entertainment has released all five seasons on DVD in Australia. In 2009, all five seasons were re-released with slimmer packaging.

Further reading 
 Patrick, Pierre and Garry McGee, The Doris Day Companion: A Beautiful Day. BearManor Media, 2009.

References

External links 

 
 Discovering Doris Television Section

The Doris Day Show
1960s American sitcoms
1970s American sitcoms
1970s American workplace comedy television series
Television shows set in San Francisco
Television shows set in the San Francisco Bay Area
CBS original programming
Television series about families
Television series by CBS Studios
English-language television shows
1968 American television series debuts
1973 American television series endings